Gonzalo Torrente Malvido (1935–2011) was a Spanish novelist, screenwriter, and writer.

1935 births
2011 deaths
Writers from Galicia (Spain)
Spanish novelists
Spanish male novelists
Spanish screenwriters
Male screenwriters
20th-century Spanish novelists
20th-century Spanish male writers